Daniel Murphy is a Canadian retired ice hockey goaltender who was a two-time All-American for Clarkson.

Career
Murphy began attending Clarkson University in 1994 after a three-year stint with his home-town junior team, the Nanaimo Clippers. Murphy became the first freshman goaltender to start for the Golden Knights since 1972. Dan helped the team win the ECAC Hockey regular season title. His numbers improved greatly as a sophomore and he finished in the top 10 in the nation with a 2.70 goals against average. Dan was named an All American after his sophomore season and he earned a spot on the All-American Second Team. Clarkson University made its second consecutive NCAA appearance with Murphy as their goaltender and lost a closly-fought game against top-seeded Boston University. Murphy improved again as a junior, winning 27 games and leading Clarkson to another league championship. While the team fell in the ECAC championship game, Clarkson received the top eastern seed and was expected to make a run for the NCAA Championship. For his senior season, Murphy played in 23 games and had a record of 10–9–2. Murphy finished his college career as Clarkson’s All-Time Wins Leader. Clarkson finished second in the ECAC and made their fourth consecutive NCAA appearance. They were set against CC in the First Round bout couldn't exact their revenge, losing 3-1. Murphy became the ECAC All Time Wins leader with 85 wins, a record that stands to this day. 

After graduating, Murphy began his professional career signing with the St Louis Blues (NHL) and split the season between the Peoria Rivermen (ECHL) and the Worcester Ice Cats (AHL). His second pro season he signed a 1 year deal with the Montreal Canadiens (NHL) and found himself with the Quebec Citadelles. Murphy was an AHL All-Star that year. Murphy was traded at the deadline to the Philadelphia Flyers (NHL) and signed a 3 year deal with Philadelphia. During his time with the Flyers Dan would play for the Philadelphia Phantoms (AHL), the Springfield Falcons (AHL) and Trenton Tians (ECHL) Upon completion of his contract he signed with the Lexington Men’O’War (ECHL) and then the Alaska Aces (ECHL). Dan’s final season was with the Fort Worth Brahmas (CHL). His season was cut short due to a career ending back injury which caused him to retire. He finished his 7 year professional career with Fort Worth.

Statistics

Regular season and playoffs

Awards and honors

References

External links

1976 births
Living people
AHCA Division I men's ice hockey All-Americans
Canadian ice hockey goaltenders
Ice hockey people from British Columbia
Sportspeople from Nanaimo
Clarkson Golden Knights men's ice hockey players
Worcester IceCats players
Peoria Rivermen (ECHL) players
Quebec Citadelles players
Philadelphia Phantoms players
Springfield Falcons players
Trenton Titans players
Milwaukee Admirals players
Lexington Men O' War players
Alaska Aces (ECHL) players
Fort Worth Brahmas players